Mervyn L. Fernandez (born December 29, 1959), nicknamed Swervin' Mervyn, is an American former professional football player who was a wide receiver with the BC Lions in the Canadian Football League (CFL) and Los Angeles Raiders in the National Football League (NFL).

Fernandez was a two-time CFL All-Star (1984–1985) and is a member of the BC Lions Wall of Fame. In 2003, Fernandez was voted a member of the BC Lions All-Time Dream Team, at the wide receiver position, as part of the club's 50-year anniversary celebration. In 2006, Fernandez was voted one of the CFL's Top 50 players (#42) of the league's modern era by Canadian sports network TSN.

High school & college career
Fernandez was a standout wide receiver for Andrew Hill High School in San Jose, California, where he picked up his famous nickname "Swervin' Mervyn" from the team's quarterback.

Following high school, Fernandez played at DeAnza Junior College in Cupertino, California, before finishing his college career at nearby San José State University. It was at San José State that the Los Angeles Raiders staff members took notice of the 6′3″, 205 pound, speedy wide receiver, and the Raiders eventually made Fernandez their 10th round pick in the 1983 NFL Draft.

Canadian Football League career
Fernandez spent his entire six-year CFL career (1982-1986, 1994) with the BC Lions.  Fernandez joined the Lions in 1982, and made an immediate impact, finishing his rookie season with over 1,000 receiving yards (1,046), and helping his team to 9–7 record.  Fernandez won the CFL Western Division Most Outstanding Rookie award, and was a finalist for the CFL's Most Outstanding Rookie award as well.

After two 1,000-yard seasons, Fernandez was a key component in the BC Lions Grey Cup championship season of 1985.  Fernandez finished the season with 95 catches and 1,727 yards for an 18.2 yards per reception average, along with 15 touchdowns.  Despite being injured and not playing in the game, following the Lions' 37–24 triumph over the Hamilton Tiger-Cats in the 73rd Grey Cup, Fernandez became the first Lion to win the CFL's Most Outstanding Player Award.

Fernandez, a two-time CFL All-Star (1984-1985) and member of the BC Lions Wall of Fame, was finally persuaded by Al Davis and the Raiders to head south and join the NFL, following the 1986 CFL season.

In 2003, Fernandez was voted a member of the BC Lions All-Time Dream Team, at the wide receiver position, as part of the club's 50-year anniversary celebration. In November 2006, Fernandez was voted one of the CFL's top 50 players (#42) of the league's modern era by Canadian sports network TSN.

National Football League career
Fernandez spent his entire 6-year NFL career (1987-1992) with one team:  the Los Angeles Raiders.  During that span, Fernandez played in 86 games and amassed 209 catches for 3,764 yards and 19 touchdowns.  While Fernandez never made the Pro Bowl, he did leave his mark on the Raiders’ record books.  His 209 career catches are 10th most by any receiver in Raiders’ history.  His 3,764 career receiving yards ranks him number 8 all-time.  His 18.01 average yards per catch for his career is first among any receiver to wear the Raiders' Silver and Black.  In 1988, Fernandez led NFL receivers in average yards per catch (26.0).

Arguably, Fernandez's finest year was 1989, when he made 57 catches for 1,069 yards and 9 touchdowns, leading all Raiders’ receivers in almost every major category, and becoming only the sixth Raider to gain over 1,000 receiving yards in a season.

Post-football life
Fernandez currently lives in Morgan Hill, California and works as a sales representative.  He is also an avid sport fisherman.  His son, Joe Fernandez, was a wide receiver at Fresno State University, who tried out but failed to make the final roster of the NFL's Seattle Seahawks in 2007.

He was inducted into the Canadian Football Hall of Fame in 2019

References

External links
 CFL Historical B.C. Lions - Mervyn Fernandez

1959 births
Living people
African-American players of American football
American players of Canadian football
American football wide receivers
BC Lions players
Canadian football wide receivers
Canadian Football League Most Outstanding Player Award winners
De Anza Dons football players
Los Angeles Raiders players
People from Merced, California
San Jose State Spartans football players
African-American players of Canadian football
Canadian Football League Rookie of the Year Award winners
Players of American football from San Jose, California
Players of Canadian football from San Jose, California
National Football League replacement players
21st-century African-American people
20th-century African-American sportspeople